Haji's Kitchen is the first album by the American band of the same name, released in 1995 under Shrapnel Records.

Reception
While the album was well received by critics and sold well, 5000 copies total, there was some minor controversy surrounding the decision by Shrapnel Records, the band's label, to not issue more copies after the limited run of 5000 were sold.

This resulted in the band requesting to be dropped from the label, and voiding their three-record deal. This was a welcome change for the band, who hadn't received any royalty checks from the label.

Track listing
 "Machine" – 5:08
 "Free" – 3:48
 "Altered Mind" – 4:35
 "2 in Me" – 4:49
 "Images of Change" – 5:06
 "Symptoms" – 3:51
 "Near" – 6:22
 "Time" – 5:04
 "Quench" – 3:57
 "Shed" – 3:50

1995 albums
Haji's Kitchen albums